Khvosh Ab (also Romanized as Khvosh Āb, Khosh Āb, Khowsh Ab, and Khūsh Āb; also known as Khāshāb) is a village in Howmeh Rural District, in the Central District of Dashtestan County, Bushehr Province, Iran. At the 2006 census, its population was 648, in 150 families.

References 

Populated places in Dashtestan County